The 1954 Cupa României Final was the 17th final of Romania's most prestigious football cup competition.

FC Dinamo București attacked furiously in the first half-hour but missed many chances before Metalul Reșița's striker Ștefan Szeleș scored twice ('30, '40), following two fast counterattacks. Dinamo tried to come back, but were unable as Metalul's players held their ground and marched to a legendary victory.

Republicii Stadium was the place of the final which was later demolished by Nicolae Ceaușescu to make room for the Palace of the Parliament.

Metalul Reșița become the first club representing Divizia B which won the Romanian Cup final.

Match details

See also 
List of Cupa României finals

References

External links
Romaniansoccer.ro

1954
1954–55 in Romanian football
1954